Jelena contains five seasons. The first three seasons contains all 22 episodes, fourth season contains 21 episodes, and the fifth season consists off 23 episodes.

Series overview

Episodes

Season 1 (2004)

Danica Maksimović, Aljoša Vučković, Irfan Mensur, Ružica Sokić, Ivan Bekjarev, Bojana Ordinačev, Srđan Karanović, Iva Štrljić, Srna Lango, Dragana Vujić and Vladan Dujović join the cast.

Season 2 (2004)

Andrej Šepetkovski join the cast.

Season 3 (2005)

Danijel Đokić join the cast. Ivan Bekjarev departed the cast at the end of the season.

Season 4 (2005)

Ružica Sokić and Srna Lango departed the cast at the end of the season.

Season 5 (2005)

References

Episodes
Lists of Serbian television series episodes